MSN TV (formerly WebTV) was a web access product consisting of a thin client device that used a television for display (instead of using a computer monitor), and the online service that supported it.  The device design and service was developed by WebTV Networks, Inc., a company started in 1995. The WebTV product was announced in July 1996 and later released on September 18, 1996. In April 1997, the company was purchased by Microsoft Corporation and in July 2001, was rebranded to MSN TV and absorbed into MSN.

While most thin clients developed in the mid-1990s were positioned as diskless workstations for corporate intranets, WebTV was positioned as a consumer product, primarily targeting those looking for a low-cost alternative to a computer for Internet access. The WebTV and MSN TV devices allowed a television set to be connected to the Internet, mainly for web browsing and e-mail. The WebTV/MSN TV service, however, also offered its own exclusive services such as a "walled garden" newsgroup service, news and weather reports, storage for user bookmarks (Favorites), IRC (and for a time, MSN Chat) chatrooms, a Page Builder service that let WebTV users create and host webpages that could later be shared to others via a link if desired, the ability to play background music from a predefined list of songs while surfing the web, dedicated sections for aggregated content covering various topics (entertainment, romance, stocks, etc.), and a few years after Microsoft bought out WebTV, integration with MSN Messenger and Hotmail. The setup included a thin client in the form of a set-top box, a remote, a network connection using dial-up, or with the introduction of Rogers Interactive TV and the MSN TV 2, the option to use broadband, and a wireless keyboard, which was sold optionally up until the 2000s.

The WebTV/MSN TV service lasted for 18 years, shutting down on September 30, 2013, and allowing subscribers to migrate their data well before that date arrived.

The original WebTV network relied on a Solaris backend network and telephone lines to deliver service to customers via dial-up, with "frontend servers" that talk directly to boxes using a custom protocol, the WebTV Protocol (WTVP), to authenticate users and deliver content to boxes. For the MSN TV 2, however, a completely new service based on IIS servers and regular HTTP/HTTPS services was used.

History

Concept 

Co-founder Steve Perlman is credited with the idea for the device. He first combined computer and television as a high-school student when he decided his home PC needed a graphics display. He went on to build software for companies such as Apple and Atari. While working at General Magic, the idea of bringing TVs and computers together resurfaced.

One night, Perlman was browsing the web and came across a Campbell's soup website with recipes. He thought that the people who might be interested in what the site had to offer were not using the web.  It occurred to him that if the television audience was enabled by a device to augment television viewing with receiving information or commercial offers through the television, then perhaps the web address could act as a signal and the television cable could be the conduit.

Early history 
A Silicon Valley startup, WebTV Networks was founded in July 1995. Perlman brought along co-founders Bruce Leak and Phil Goldman shortly after conceiving the basic concept. The company operated out of half of a former BMW car dealership building on Alma Street in Palo Alto, California, which was being used for storage by the Museum of American Heritage. WebTV had been able to obtain the space for very low rent, but it was suboptimal for technology development.

Before incorporation, the company referred to itself as Artemis Research to disguise the nature of its business. The info page of its original website explained that it was studying "sleep deprivation, poor diet and no social life for extended periods on humans and dwarf rabbits". The dwarf rabbit reference was an inside joke among WebTV's hard-working engineers—Phil Goldman's pet house rabbit Bowser (inspiration for the General Magic logo) was often found roaming the WebTV building late into the night while the engineers were working—although WebTV actually received inquiries from real research groups conducting similar studies and seeking to exchange data.

The company hired many engineers and a few business development employees early on, having about 30 total employees by October 1995. Two early employees of Artemis were from Apple Inc: Andy Rubin, creator of the Android cell phone OS, and Joe Britt. Both men would later be two of the founders of Danger, Inc. (originally Danger Research).

WebTV Networks' business model was to license a reference design to consumer electronics companies for a WebTV Internet Terminal, a set-top box that attached to a telephone line and automatically connected to the Internet through a dial-up modem. The consumer electronics companies' income was derived from selling the WebTV set-top box. WebTV's income was derived from operating the WebTV Service, the Internet-based service to which the set-top boxes connected and for which it collected a fee from WebTV subscribers. The service provided features such as HTML-based email, and proxied websites, which were reformatted by the service before they were sent to set-top box, to make them display more efficiently on a television screen.

WebTV closed its first round of financing, US$1,500,000, from Marvin Davis in September 1995, which it used to develop its prototype set-top box, using proprietary hardware and firmware. The company also used the financing to develop the online service that the set-top boxes connected to. WebTV leveraged their limited startup funds by licensing a reference design for the appliance to Sony and Philips. Eventually other companies would also become licensees and WebTV would profit on the monthly service fees.  After 22 months, the company was sold to Microsoft for $425 million, with each of the three founders receiving $64 million.

Barely surviving to reach announcement 
By the spring of 1996 WebTV Networks employed approximately 70 people, many of them finishing their senior year at nearby Stanford University, or former employees of either Apple Computer or General Magic.  WebTV had started negotiating with Sony to manufacture and distribute the WebTV set-top box, but negotiations had taken much longer than WebTV had expected, and WebTV had used up its initial funding.  Steve Perlman liquidated his assets, ran up his credit cards and mortgaged his house to provide bridge financing while seeking additional venture capital. Because Sony had insisted upon exclusive distribution rights for the first year, WebTV had no other distribution partner in place, and just before WebTV was to close venture capital financing from Brentwood Associates, Sony sent WebTV a certified letter stating it had decided not to proceed with WebTV.  It was a critical juncture for WebTV, because the Brentwood financing had been predicated on the expectation of a future relationship with Sony, and if Brentwood had decided to not proceed with the financing after being told that Sony had backed out, WebTV would have gone bankrupt and Perlman would have lost everything. But Brentwood decided to proceed with the financing despite losing Sony's involvement, and further financing from Paul Allen's Vulcan Ventures soon followed.

WebTV then proceeded to close a non-exclusive WebTV set-top box distribution deal with Philips, which provided competitive pressure causing Sony to change its mind, to resume its relationship with WebTV and also to distribute WebTV.

WebTV was announced on July 10, 1996, generating a large wave of press attention as not only the first television-based use of the World Wide Web, but also as the first consumer-electronics device to access the World Wide Web without a personal computer. After the product's announcement, the company closed additional venture financing, including investments from Microsoft Corporation, Citicorp, Seagate Technology, Inc., Soros Capital, L.P., St. Paul Venture Capital and Times Mirror Company.

The launch 
WebTV was launched on September 18, 1996, within one year after its first round of financing, with WebTV set-top boxes in stores from Sony and Philips, and WebTV's online service running from servers in its tiny office, still based in the former BMW dealership.

The initial price for the WebTV set-top box was US$349 for the Sony version and US$329 for the Philips version, with a wireless keyboard available for about an extra US$50. The monthly service fee initially was US$19.95 per month for unlimited Web surfing and e-mail.

There was little difference between the first Sony and the Philips WebTV set-top boxes, except for the housing and packaging. The WebTV set-top box had very limited processing and memory resources (just a 112 MHz MIPS CPU, 2 megabytes of RAM, 2 megabytes of ROM, 1 megabyte of Flash memory) and the device relied upon a connection through a 33.6 kbit/s dialup modem to connect to the WebTV Service, where powerful servers provide back-end support to the WebTV set-top boxes to support a full Web-browsing and email experience for the subscribers.

Initial sales were slow. By April 1997, WebTV had only 56,000 subscribers, but the pace of subscriber growth accelerated after that, achieving 150,000 subscribers by Autumn 1997, about 325,000 subscribers by April 1998 and about 800,000 subscribers by May 1999. WebTV achieved profitability by Spring 1998, and grossed over US$1.3 billion in revenue through its first 8 years of operation. In 2005 WebTV was still grossing US$150 million per year in revenue with 65% gross margin.

WebTV briefly classified as a weapon 
Because WebTV utilized strong encryption, specifically the 128-bit encryption (not SSL) used to communicate with its proprietary service, upon launch in 1996, WebTV was classified as "munitions" (a military weapon) by the United States government and was therefore barred from export under United States security laws at the time. Because WebTV was widely distributed in consumer electronic stores under the Sony and Philips brands for only US$325, its munitions classification was used to argue that the US should no longer consider devices incorporating strong encryption to be munitions, and should permit their export. Two years later, in October 1998, WebTV obtained a special exemption permitting its export, despite the strong encryption, and shortly thereafter, laws concerning export of cryptography in the United States were changed to generally permit the export of strong encryption.

Microsoft takes notice 
In February 1997, in an investor meeting with Microsoft, Steve Perlman was approached by Microsoft's Senior Vice President for Consumer Platforms Division, Craig Mundie. Despite the fact that the initial WebTV sales had been modest, Mundie expressed that Microsoft was impressed with WebTV and saw significant potential both in WebTV's product offering and in applying the technology to other Microsoft consumer and video product offerings. Microsoft offered to acquire WebTV, build a Microsoft campus in Silicon Valley around WebTV, and establish WebTV as a Microsoft division to develop television-based products and services, with Perlman as the division's president.

Discussions proceeded rapidly, involving Bill Gates, then CEO of Microsoft, personally. Gates called Perlman at his home on Easter Sunday in March 1997, and Perlman described to Gates WebTV's next generation products in development, which would be the first consumer devices to incorporate hard disks, including the WebTV Plus, and the WebTV Digital Video Recorders. Gates' interest was piqued, and negotiations between Microsoft and WebTV rapidly proceeded to closure, with both sides working around the clock to get the deal done. Negotiation time was so short that the hour lost due to the change to Daylight Saving Time the night before the planned announcement, which the parties had neglected to factor into their schedule, almost left them without enough time to finish the deal.

On April 6, 1997, 20 months after WebTV's founding, and only six weeks after negotiations with Microsoft began, during a scheduled speech at the National Association of Broadcasters conference in Las Vegas, Nevada, Craig Mundie announced that Microsoft had acquired WebTV. The acquisition price was US$503 million, but WebTV was so young a company that most of the employees' stock options had yet to be vested. As such, the vested shares at the time of the announcement amounted to US$425 million, and that was the acquisition price announced.

Subsequent to the acquisition, WebTV became a Silicon Valley-based division of Microsoft, with Steve Perlman as its president. The WebTV division began developing most of Microsoft's television-based products, including the first satellite Digital Video Recorders (the DishPlayer for EchoStar's Dish Network and UltimateTV for DirecTV), Microsoft's cable TV products, the Xbox 360 hardware, and Microsoft's Mediaroom IPTV platform.

In May 1999, America Online announced that it was going to compete directly with Microsoft in delivering Internet over television sets by introducing AOL TV.

In June 1999, Steve Perlman left Microsoft and started Rearden, a business incubator for new companies in media and entertainment technology.

MSN TV rebranding 
In July 2001, six years after WebTV's founding, Microsoft rebranded WebTV as MSN TV. Contracts were terminated with all other licensed manufacturers of the WebTV hardware except RCA, leaving them as the sole manufacturer of further hardware. Promotion of the WebTV brand ended.

In later years, the number of consumers using dialup access had dropped and as the Classic and Plus clients were restricted to dialup access, their subscriber count began to drop. Because the WebTV client was subsidized hardware, the company had always required individual subscriptions for each box, but with the subsidies ended, MSN started offering free use of MSN TV boxes to their computer users who subscribed to MSN as an incentive not to depart for discount dialup ISPs.

Broadband MSN TV 
In 2001, Rogers Cable partnered with Microsoft to introduce "Rogers Interactive TV" in Canada.  The service enabled Rogers' subscribers to access the Web via their TV sets, create their own websites, shop online, chat, and access e-mail. This initiative was the first broadband implementation of MSN TV.

In late 2004, Microsoft introduced MSN TV 2. Codenamed the "Deuce", it was capable of broadband access, and it introduced a revamped user interface and new capabilities. These include offline viewing of media (so long as a user was already logged in), audio and video streaming (broadband only), Adobe Reader, support for viewing Microsoft Office documents (namely Microsoft Word), Windows Media Player, the ability to access Windows computers on a home network to function as a media player, and even the ability the use of a mouse, although that was most likely unintentional at first. MSN TV 2 also kept some key features from the first generation of WebTV/MSN TV, such as its MIDI engine and the ability to play background music while surfing the web. MSN TV 2 used a different online service from the original WebTV/MSN TV, but it offered many of the same services, such as chatrooms, instant messaging, weather, news, aggregated "info centers", and newsgroups, and like that service, still required a subscription to use. For those with broadband, the fee was US$99 yearly.

For inexpensive devices, the cost of licensing the operating system is substantial. For Microsoft, however, it would be actualizing a sunk cost, and when Microsoft released the MSN TV 2 model, they adopted standard PC architecture and used a customized version of Windows CE as the operating system. This allowed MSN TV 2 to more easily and inexpensively keep current.

Discontinuation 
By late 2009, MSN TV hardware was no longer being sold by Microsoft, although service continued for existing users for the next four years. Attempting to go to the "Buy MSN TV" section on the MSN TV website at the time resulted in the following message being shown:

"Sorry, MSN TV hardware is no longer available for purchase from Microsoft. Microsoft continues to support the subscription service for existing WebTV and MSN TV customers."

On July 1, 2013, an email was sent out to subscribers stating that the MSN TV service would be shutting down on September 30, 2013. During that time, subscribers were advised to convert any accounts on the first-generation service to Microsoft accounts and to migrate any favorites and other data they had on their MSN TV accounts to SkyDrive. Once September 30, 2013 finally arrived, the WebTV/MSN TV service fully closed. Existing customers were offered MSN Dial-Up Internet Access accounts with a promotion. Customer service was available for non-technical and billing questions until January 15, 2014.

Technology

Set-top box 
Since the WebTV set-top box was a dedicated web-browsing appliance that did not need to be based on a standard operating system, the cost of licensing an operating system could be avoided. All first generation boxes featured a 64-bit MIPS RISC CPU, boot ROM and flash ROM storage for all Classic and New Plus models, RAM, and a smart card reader, which wasn't significantly utilized. The web browser that ran on the set-top box was compatible with both Netscape Navigator and Microsoft Internet Explorer standards. The first WebTV Classic set-top boxes from Sony and Philips had a 33.6k modem, and 2 MB of RAM, boot ROM, and flash ROM. Later models had 56k modems and increased ROM/RAM capacity. The WebTV set-top boxes leveraged the service's server-side caching proxy which reformatted and compressed web pages before sending them to the box, a feature generally unavailable to dial-up ISP users at the time and as such, had to be developed by WebTV. For web browsing purposes, given WebTV's thin client software, there was no need for a hard disk, but by putting the browser in non-volatile memory, upgrades could be downloaded from the WebTV service onto the set-top box.

The WebTV set-top box was designed so that at a specified time, it would check to see if there was any email waiting. If there was, it would illuminate a red LED on the device so the consumer would know it was worth connecting to pick up their mail.

A second model, the "Plus", was introduced a year later. This model featured a TV tuner to allow watching television in a PIP (Picture-In-Picture) window, allowed one to capture video stills from the tuner or composite inputs as a JPEG that could then be uploaded to a WebTV discussion post, email, or a "scrapbook" on a user's account for later use, and included a video tuner that allowed one to schedule a VCR in a manner like TiVo allowed several years later. The Plus also included a 56k modem, support for ATVEF, a technology that allowed users to download special script-laden pages to interact with television shows, and in original models, had a 1.1 GB hard drive for storage in place of the ROM chips used in the previous Classic models, mainly in order to accommodate large nightly downloads of television schedules. Around Fall 1998, plans for a "Derby" revision of the WebTV Plus were announced, which was rumored to have a faster CPU and more memory. By early 1999, only one Derby unit was produced by Sony as a revision of their INT-W200 Plus model, but no substantial changes were made to the hardware outside of the CPU being upgraded with no change in clock speed, and the modem being changed to a softmodem. As chip prices dropped, later versions of the Plus used an M-Systems DiskOnChip flash ROM instead, alongside increasing RAM capacity to 16 MB.

WebTV produced reference designs of models incorporating a disk-based personal video recorder and a satellite tuner for EchoStar's Dish Network (referred to as the DishPlayer) and for DirecTV (called UltimateTV). In 2001, EchoStar sued Microsoft for failing to support the WebTV DishPlayer.  EchoStar subsequently sought to acquire DirecTV and was the presumptive acquirer, but EchoStar was ultimately blocked by the Federal Communications Commission. While EchoStar's lawsuit against Microsoft was in process, DirecTV (presumptively acquired and controlled by EchoStar) dropped UltimateTV (thus ending Microsoft's satellite product initiatives) and picked TiVo's DirecTV product as its only Digital Video Recorder offering.

As an ease-of-use design consideration, WebTV early decided to reformat pages rather than have users doing sideways scrolling. As entry-level PCs evolved from VGA resolution of 640x480 to SVGA resolution of 800x600, and web site dimensions followed suit, reformatting the PC-sized web pages to fit the 560-pixel width of a United States NTSC television screen became less satisfactory. The WebTV browser also translated HTML frames as tables in order to avoid the need for a mouse.

In Japan, WebTV had a small run starting around late 1997, with a couple "Classic" Japanese units being released with hard drives and two times more RAM than American Classic and Old Plus units at the time, and in Spring of 1999, allowed customers to choose the option of utilizing Sega's Dreamcast video game console, which came with a built-in modem, to access WebTV. This was possible as Sega and Microsoft collaborated to create a port of the WebTV technology on the Dreamcast, using the Windows CE abstraction layer supported on the console and what's believed to be a version of the Internet Explorer 2.0 browser engine. The Japanese service ended sometime in March 2002.

Security 
Security was always an issue with the WebTV/MSN TV service. This was primarily due to the fact that proprietary URLs used to perform certain actions on the service had very little verification procedures in place and for a while, could easily be executed through the URL panel on the set-top box.

Starting around 1998, self-proclaimed WebTV hackers quickly figured out ways to exploit the service's poor security with these vulnerable URLs, resulting in many things which include but aren't limited to: access to internal sections of the production WebTV service such as "Tricks," which hosted several pages designed to troubleshoot the WebTV box and service; the ability to remotely change the settings of a subscriber's box; or even remotely performing actions on any account, including deleting them, which the service did not verify on whether the requests were coming from the account holder or not. These "hackers" even found a way to connect to internal WebTV services and discovered WebTV content that was previously unknown to the public, including a version of Doom for WebTV Plus units that could be downloaded from one of these services at one point.

During the same year WebTV hacking started to pick up, WebTV Networks had tried their hardest to keep these rogue users back on the production service, and even going as far as terminating people involved with any unauthorized usage of the WebTV service, regardless of their motives. The most notable of these terminations is of WebTV user Matt Squadere, known by his internet handle MattMan69, who is well known for having his and others access terminated without warning due to connecting to the internal WebTV services "TestDrive" and "Weekly", which was possible from accessing the Tricks section of WebTV with a password that was shared around at the time. Matt was specifically terminated when he accessed TestDrive a second time and reported it to WebTV Networks' 1-800 number, which he was initially rewarded for with a WebTV shirt. At the same time, WebTV had its privacy policy changed without warning subscribers prior to doing so, which legally gave them the right to terminate any user for any reason without making it necessary to warn them as to what they've done. This caused a massive uproar from subscribers towards WebTV Networks regarding their fairness and ethics with their legal agreements.

After the Tricks incident, it appears that future WebTV hacking endeavors were kept secret between those well known in the hacking scene and were not reported to WebTV Networks directly, supposedly to be able to keep using already discovered methods that were not already nicked. This included any findings on the more technical workings of the WebTV service, including protocol security and service URLs that were still exploitable. Some of the remaining hacks were also used to target unsuspecting WebTV users. One example of this, which concerns being able to have unauthorized access to one's WebTV account, has been documented on the "Tricks/Hacks Archive" section of Matt Squadere's current site, "WebTV MsnTV Secret Pics":

...I chose my victims by reading the News Groups. I would look for those punks that liked to talk sh*t, you know the ones that swore up and down that they could hack your account of fry your webtv unit but in reality they couldn't even access the home page. I would also target those lamers that thought they were cool cause they knew how to send a e-mail bomb that could power off your webtv box and thought they were king shit, lmao!

WebTV/MSN TV was also victim to a virus written in July 2002 by 43 year old David Jeansonne dubbed "NEAT", which changed the local dial-up access number on victims' boxes to 911. This number would be dialed the next time the WebTV/MSN TV box had to dial in. It was sent to 18 MSN TV users through an attachment in an email with the subject "NEAT", and disguised itself by showing an interface for a "tool" that could change the colors and fonts of the MSN TV user interface, which was originally written by WebTV hacker HACKERREAMER. It was supposedly forwarded to 3 other users by some of the initial victims, making the total victim count 21. At least 10 of the victims reported having the police show up at their homes as a result of their boxes dialing 911. There are also claims of the virus having the ability to mass-mail itself, although this wasn't properly confirmed at the time the virus was prevalent. The writer of this virus was eventually arrested in February 2004 and charged with cyberterrorism.

Protocols 
With the first generation of the WebTV/MSN TV service, the main protocol used for the majority of service communication was WTVP, or the WebTV Protocol. WTVP is a TCP-based protocol that is essentially a proprietary version of HTTP 1.0 with the ability to serve both standard web content and specialized service content to WebTV/MSN TV users. It also introduced its own protocol extensions, which include but aren't limited to 128-bit RC4-based message encryption, ticket-based authorization, proprietary challenge–response authentication to both verify clients logging in to the service and to supply them session keys used for message encryption, and persistent connections. This protocol was supported by all first-generation WebTV/MSN TV devices and the Sega Dreamcast release of WebTV up until the September 2013 discontinuation of the entire service (March 2002 for those in Japan).

WTVP had extremely minimal documentation back in WebTV's prime and only by 2019, 6 whole years after the service shut down, did more attempts to document it crop up, although not by much initially as it was first done by releasing a third party proof-of-concept WebTV server dubbed the "WebTV Server Emulator," which only implemented the bare minimum of the service and didn't properly document a whole lot about it. As of 2021, there has been an attempt to further explore the WTVP protocol in a more detailed and concise fashion along with other technical parts of WebTV/MSN TV with the "WebTV Wiki" project, run by someone outside WebTV staff and its hacking scene. There have also since been open-source software projects available started by others that aim to create a working WebTV/MSN TV service while documenting as much of the service protocols as possible. With a lack of sufficient resources on any technical WebTV information and not many people showing enough interest to figure out how the service as a whole worked and share their findings publicly, though, progress on overall documentation on these protocols has been very slow.

Another protocol believed to have been used by the original service is dubbed "Mail Notify", which is a UDP-based protocol that is believed to have taken part in delivering e-mail notifications to WebTV boxes. Its existence has only been confirmed in a leaked Microsoft document and it is likely that it was just a backend component of the original WebTV service.

MSN TV 2 
The MSN TV 2's service was completely separate from the original one and ran on completely different infrastructure. It, like the first generation service's protocols, had no documentation available publicly during its original run. This is partly because when it released, people already into WebTV/MSN TV hacking started losing interest and some felt that the MSN TV 2 was not worth putting time into hacking.

Based on recent efforts to reverse engineer the MSN TV 2 service and the little information that has been disclosed by the very few people from the original hacking scene that stuck around for the MSN TV 2, the service was a standard HTTP/S web service that ran on IIS servers. Most MSN TV services such as Mail, Discuss, and Chat were accessed from a trusted MSN TV service domain via HTTPS and would run JavaScript that made use of AJAX and proprietary MSN TV ActiveX controls to do things such as write user settings to the box or talk to other services. For some services, like Favorites and Messenger, those were entirely local to the box and would simply contact outside services directly (Favorites only did this for synchronization purposes). Services for login and checking mail would send JavaScript commands to boxes, which would then execute the script in a trusted browser context. These scripts also made use of proprietary ActiveX controls to tell the MSN TV 2 boxes what to do and give it the necessary data it needed, such as the service list to use on an active session or if it received new mail. It's also believed XML was one of the formats used by the MSN TV 2 service, although this cannot be 100% confirmed right now.

WebTV/MSN TV client hardware

Models

Confirmed

Not Confirmed

Hacking attempts 

In February 2006, Chris Wade analyzed the proprietary BIOS of the MSN TV 2 set top box, and created a sophisticated memory patch which allowed it to be flashed and used to boot Linux on it. An open-source solution to enabling TV output on the MSN TV 2 and similar devices was made available in 2009. There were also recorded attempts to make use of unused IDE  pins on the MSN TV 2's motherboard and supply a hard drive, most likely to add extra storage beyond the 64 MB given by the default CompactFlash storage. Outside of these attempts, though, not much has been done in the realm of hacking the WebTV/MSN TV hardware.

See also 
 Microsoft Venus
 Set-top box
 SmartTV
 AOL TV
 Google TV (smart TV platform)
 Caldera DR-WebSpyder

References

External links 
 .
 WebTV Wiki
 
 .
 
 

Interactive television
Streaming television
MSN
Set-top box
Thin clients
Products and services discontinued in 2013
Telecommunications-related introductions in 1996
Computer-related introductions in 1996